Oinomancy (or oenomancy or œnomancy) is a form of divination conducted by examining patterns in wine.  An ancient technique, oinomancy was performed by a priestess known as a Bacchante, and protected by Bacchus, the Roman god of wine. Oinomancy is still practiced today, but is rare in the United States. 

Oinomancy could be performed in a number of ways:

Wine is spilled on cloth or paper, and the resulting stains are studied.
Cloth or paper is soaked or boiled in wine, and the resulting appearance of the material is studied.
The appearance of wine being poured as an offering during a libation is studied.
The sediment in the bottom of a glass or bottle of wine is studied.
The physical features (color, taste, etc.) of wine are studied.

References
Cunningham, Scott.  Divination for Beginners.  Llewellyn Worldwide, 2003.

External links
"Oenomancy" at Occultipedia

Divination